Benbella Benmiloud (born 1 January 1958) is an Algerian former football player.

Honours
Algerian Championship
Champion (1): 1984 with GC Mascara

External links

1958 births
Living people
Algerian footballers
Algeria international footballers
Algerian expatriate footballers
Algerian expatriate sportspeople in Morocco
Expatriate footballers in Morocco
ASM Oran players
GC Mascara players
Association football midfielders
21st-century Algerian people